Metahapalodectes is an extinct mesonychian hapalodectid.

References

External links
Paleo Database
Paleo Taxamony

Mesonychids
Eocene mammals of Asia
Prehistoric placental genera
Fossil taxa described in 1976